The Kanpur Bolshevik conspiracy case was a controversial court case initiated in British India in 1924.

After Peshawar in 1922, two more conspiracy cases were instituted by the British government, one in Kanpur (1924) and Meerut (1929). The accused in the cases included, among others, important communist organisers who worked in India, such as S.V. Ghate, S.A. Dange, Muzaffar Ahmad and Akshay Thakur, and members of the émigré party, such as Rafiq Ahmad and Shaukat Usmani.

On 17 March 1924, S.A. Dange, M.N. Roy, Muzaffar Ahmad, Nalini Gupta, Shaukat Usmani, Singaravelu Chettiar, Ghulam Hussain and others were charged that they as communists were seeking "to deprive the King Emperor of his sovereignty of British India, by complete separation of India from imperialistic Britain by a violent revolution" in what was called the Cawnpore (now spelt Kanpur) Bolshevik Conspiracy case.

The case attracted interest of the people towards Comintern plan to bring about violent revolution in India. "Pages of newspapers daily splashed sensational communist plans and people for the first time learned such a large scale about communism and its doctrines and the aims of the Communist International in India".

Singaravelu Chettiar was released on account of illness. M.N. Roy was out of the country and therefore could not be arrested. Ghulam Hussain confessed that he had received money from the Russians in Kabul and was pardoned. Muzaffar Ahmed, Shaukat Usmani and Dange were sentenced for four years of imprisonment. This case was responsible for actively introducing communism to the Indian masses.

After Kanpur, Britain had triumphantly declared that the case had "finished off the communists". But the industrial town of Kanpur, in December 1925, witnessed a conference of different communist groups, under the chairmanship of Singaravelu Chettiar. Dange, Muzaffar Ahmed, Nalini Gupta, Shaukat Usmani were among the key organizers of the meeting. The meeting adopted a resolution for the formation of the Communist Party of India with its headquarters in Bombay (now Mumbai). The British government's extreme hostility  towards the Bolsheviks, made them to decide not to function openly as a communist party, but they chose a more open and non-federated platform, under the name the Workers and Peasants Parties.

See also

 Communism in India

References

Indian independence movement
 Communist Party of India
1924 in India
1924 in case law
History of Uttar Pradesh
Political repression in British India
History of Kanpur
Indian case law